Colony Township was a township in Greeley County, Kansas, USA.  As of the 2000 census, the population of the former township was 172.

Geography
According to the USGS, it contains two cemeteries: Mathews and Rogers.

The stream of South Fork White Woman Creek runs through this township.

Greeley County was previously divided into three townships.  However, in 1992, Colony Township and Harrison Township were merged into Tribune Township, leaving only one township for the county.  This was not reported to the U.S. census until 2006, thus the 2000 census did not reflect the merger, but the 2010 census did.

Transportation
Colony Township contained two airports or landing strips: Tuttle Landing Field and Walter Airport.

References

 USGS Geographic Names Information System (GNIS)

External links
 US-Counties.com
 City-Data.com

Townships in Greeley County, Kansas
Townships in Kansas